The New York Film Critics Circle Award for Best Animated Film (Feature) is an award given by the New York Film Critics Circle, honoring the finest achievements in animated filmmaking.

Winners

1990s

2000s

2010s

2020s

Multiple winners (3 or more)
Hayao Miyazaki - 3

References

External links
Homepage

Lists of films by award
New York Film Critics Circle Awards
Awards for best animated feature film
Awards established in 1999